Saint-Augustin-de-Desmaures is a city in central Quebec, Canada, on the Saint Lawrence River, adjacent to Quebec City.

The town was founded in 1691 by three families (Desroches, Racette, Couture). It was merged with Quebec City on January 1, 2002 as part of the 2000–2006 municipal reorganization in Quebec and became part of the Laurentien borough of that city. However, after a 2004 referendum it was re-established as a separate city on January 1, 2006.

The local post office was previously named Saint-Augustin-de-Portneuf from 1852, then Saint-Augustin-de-Québec from 1918 until this was renamed to the community's current name in 1986.

Demographics 

Population trend:
 Population in 2021: 19,907 (2016 to 2021 population change: 5.8%)
 Population in 2016: 18,820 
 Population in 2011: 18,141 
 Population in 2006: 17,281
 Population in 2001: 15,732
 Population in 1996: 14,771
 Population in 1991: 12,680

Mother tongue:
 English as first language: 1.1%
 French as first language: 97.5%
 English and French as first language: 0.2%
 Other as first language: 1.2%

In 2006, Saint-Augustin-de-Desmaures was 98.0% White, 0.5% Aboriginal, and 1.5% Visible Minorities.

See also
 Municipal reorganization in Quebec

References

External links
	

Cities and towns in Quebec
Populated places established in 1691
Incorporated places in Capitale-Nationale
1691 establishments in the French colonial empire